The cerebellum consists of three parts, a median and two lateral, which are continuous with each other, and are substantially the same in structure. The median portion is constricted, and is called the vermis, from its annulated appearance which it owes to the transverse ridges and furrows upon it; the lateral expanded portions are named the hemispheres.

Sections
The "intermediate hemisphere" is also known as the "spinocerebellum".
The "lateral hemisphere" is also known as the "pontocerebellum".
The lateral hemisphere is considered the portion of the cerebellum to develop most recently.

Additional images

See also
 Anatomy of the cerebellum

References

External links

 
 NIF Search - Cerebellar Hemisphere via the Neuroscience Information Framework

Cerebellum